Morimopsis is a genus of longhorn beetles of the subfamily Lamiinae, containing the following species:

 Morimopsis assamensis Breuning, 1965
 Morimopsis dalihodi Holzschuh, 2003
 Morimopsis glabripennis Holzschuh, 2003
 Morimopsis lacrymans Thomson, 1857
 Morimopsis mussardi Breuning, 1965
 Morimopsis truncatipennis Breuning, 1940
 Morimopsis unicolor Breuning, 1975

References

Morimopsini
Cerambycidae genera